Tseng Wen-hui ((born 31 March 1926) is a Taiwanese public figure, First Lady of the Republic of China (Taiwan) from 1988 to 2000, and widow of former Taiwanese President Lee Teng-hui.

Biography

Tseng was born on 31 March 1926 in Sanshi Village, Taihoku Prefecture, now known as present-day New Taipei City, Taiwan.

Tseng married Lee on 9 February 1949, when he was a teaching assistant in the Faculty of Agriculture and Economics at National Taiwan University. The couple had three children. Their eldest son, Lee Hsien-wen, (c. 1950 – 21 March 1982) died of sinus cancer. Daughters Anna and Annie, were born c. 1952 and c. 1954, respectively.

Politically, Tseng stated that she preferred to keep a low profile for her husband's sake. However, she became the subject of controversy in 2000 when New Party politicians Elmer Fung, Hsieh Chi-ta, and Tai Chi accused her of attempting to flee to New York City with a suitcase containing NT$85 million. In response, she filed a defamation suit against them on 29 March 2000, making her the only first lady in Taiwan's history to become involved in a lawsuit. The case involved the testimony of Wang Kuang-yu, which marked the first time that any Investigation Bureau director testified in a case under Investigation Bureau jurisdiction. The three were cleared of charges, but Tseng appealed the verdict to the Taiwan High Court. The appeal was submitted in April 2002, and the High Court began its own investigation in November. In December 2003, the High Court reversed the Taipei District Court's decision. All three accusers were fined NT$81,000. Hsieh refused to pay, and was sentenced to three months imprisonment.

References 

1926 births
Living people
First ladies of the Republic of China
Second ladies of the Republic of China
Taiwanese Christians
People from New Taipei
Lee Teng-hui